

Arthropods

Insects

Archosauromorphs

Archosauromorphs

Plesiosaurs
 Plesiosaur gastroliths documented.

Synapsids

Non-mammalian

References

 Welles, Samuel P. and Bump, J. D.; 1949; Alzadasaurus pembertoni, a new elasmosaur from the Late Cretaceous of South Dakota; Journal of Paleontology; 23(5) pp. 521–535
 Sanders F, Manley K, Carpenter K. Gastroliths from the Lower Cretaceous sauropod Cedarosaurus weiskopfae. In: Tanke D.H, Carpenter K, editors. Mesozoic vertebrate life: new research inspired by the paleontology of Philip J. Currie. Indiana University Press; Bloomington, IN: 2001. pp. 166–180.